The Roland RE-201 Space Echo is an audio effects unit that produces delay and reverb effects. It was produced by Roland Corporation from 1974 to 1990. Roland produced several smaller versions in later years.

Background
A tape echo device records incoming audio to a loop of magnetic tape, then replays the continuous loop over the playback head before it is erased again by new incoming audio. The first commercial echo unit was the EchoSonic which had its own amplification and a delicate tape mechanism that required frequent attention. The design was improved in the Echoplex with adjustable echo delay. It provided a reliable and much smaller, portable package that could be used with any amplifier. 

In the late 1960s, the Japanese engineer Ikutaro Kakehashi, who later founded the Roland Corporation, built a tape echo using a short tape loop based on the design of the Echoplex and the EchoSonic; his Ace Tone EC-1 Echo Chamber was the first of a number of models. In 1973, then operating under the Roland brand, Kakehashi introduced the Roland Echo Chamber RE-100 and RE-200, the latter with an added spring reverb.

Kakehashi's breakthrough development came in 1974 with the RE-101 and RE-201 Space Echo units, which used the standard 1/4" tape of the open-reel variety, but made as one, continuous loop. It uses no reels of any kind; the tape is transported via a capstan drive. The tape loop is contained in a loose, constantly moving jumble in the tape chamber (also known as the tape tank) under a plastic panel which protects the tape and keeps it from getting tangled. The design resulted in lower levels of noise, wow, and flutter, and cut down on tape wear. Replacement tapes were sold as well, named RT-1L.

There are several control dials on the device that alter such aspects as tape speed, repeat pattern (an 11-position rotary switch), one instrument and two microphone inputs, a single analog backlit VU meter for all three inputs, wet/dry mix for both echo and reverb, and intensity (number of repeats), that can be adjusted to a user's liking; and bass/treble controls to EQ the sound of the repeats (not the dry signal), as well as dry and effected "Echo" output jacks with a switch for output setting (-10, -20, -35db levels.)

Used as a delay/echo, the Roland RE-201 is said to produce a potentially unpredictable delay that is warm and gritty sounding. It is also capable of producing a large variety of its own sound effects, even without an input signal (by turning the intensity control to maximum and allowing the unit to self-regenerate, or self-oscillate, while manipulating the tape speed and other controls). 

In 2010, Roland's guitar effects company, Boss Corporation, introduced a digital modeling pedal of the space echo, the RE-20. In 2021 Boss introduced a Space Echo in their standard "mini" encosure, the RE-2, in addition to a larger unit with additional options, the RE-202.

Other Roland tape echo units

RE-100
The Roland RE-100 Echo Chamber was one of the earliest models of tape delay that Roland produced being released in 1973. Roland had previously been releasing tape delays under the name Ace Tone, these units included the Ace Tone EC-1 (Echo Chamber 1). The Roland RE-100 was released alongside the Roland RE-200 which had the added addition of a spring reverb. The RE-100 was similar in styling to the later Roland tape delay units, housed in a similar black wooden casing. The front panel had a mode selector dial with six different delay settings. For repeat sounds settings 1-3 were used and for more of a 'swelling' sound settings 4-6 could be selected. There were controls for intensity which when turned clockwise would increase the number of echoes. The repeat rate control was used for adjusting the repeat times of the echoes. Controls were also available for the echo volume, this would decide how much effected signal would be heard along with the original signal. There were two controls for the tone of the output signal, these were simple bass and treble controls. The difference that these early units had from later models was the standby switch. This switch controlled the tape movement. When the lever was pushed upwards the tape began moving to activate the echo sound. When the echo was not needed the switch was pushed downwards, the idea of the standby switch was to assure longer lives of the tape heads and the tape itself.

RE-200

The Roland RE-200 was released with the addition of a spring reverb. This was the main difference between the RE-100 and the RE-200. The RE-200 was similar in styling to the later Roland tape delay units, house in a similar black wooden casing. The front panel had a mode selector dial with eleven different effect settings. For repeat sounds settings 1-4 were used and settings 5-11 were used for repeat and spring reverb effects. There were controls for intensity which when turned clockwise would increase the number of echoes. The repeat rate control was used for adjusting the repeat times of the echoes. Controls were also available for the echo volume, this would decide how much effected signal would be heard along with the original signal. There were two controls for the tone of the output signal, these were simple bass and treble controls. The difference that these early units had from later models was the standby switch. This switch controlled the tape movement. When the lever was pushed upwards the tape began moving to activate the echo sound. When the echo was not needed the switch was pushed downwards, the idea of the standby switch was to assure longer lives of the tape heads and the tape itself. The RE-100 and RE-200 were soon replaced by the Roland RE-101 and the Roland RE-201.

RE-101

The RE-101 was released alongside the Roland RE-201 as part of the second ‘RE’ range. It replaced the earlier Roland RE-100 model and included improvements to build and quality. It was the basic model of the second range and did not include a spring reverb like the RE-201.  
Features included a new free running system that minimized noise, wow and flutter when the internal tape loop was running, this increased the tape life by 6-15 times (up to 300 hours of use).  Other new improvements included lower noise levels that improved the sound quality.

RE-150
The main differences in the RE-150 compared with the RE 101 are the following:

Two playback heads: According to this, the options of the rotary switch are different also, the first three ("repeat") options are: 
1) first head 2) second head, 3) both heads.
The three remaining ("single") options are the same but not affected by the Intensity control.

Two outputs: a direct and an echo only output. When only direct output is connected, it gives out dry+echo signal. When both are connected, the direct output gives only the dry signal, the echo only the echo signal, offering this way more options for channeling the signals.

RE-301
The Roland RE-301 was a regular RE-201 Space Echo with three additional features: sound on sound recording, allowing it to be used as a looper as well as an echo; an analog chorus circuit; and the ability to control the repeat rate externally by control voltage via foot pedal. A notable user is guitarist Brian Setzer, for the slapback sound sought after in rockabilly.

RE-501 / SRE-555

The Roland RE-501 was the last tape effect that Roland produced as the introduction of digital delay and reverb was quickly replacing the older style tape effects. It included a newer orange and black livery that fit in with the new range of Roland Rack products, such as the Roland SVC-350 vocoder. Roland also released a rackmount version of the RE-501 known as the SRE-555. The RE-501 was built using Roland's free running tape system that minimized wow and flutter and extended the life of the tape for more than 300 hours of use. It included dual outputs for a three dimensional sound. The outputs included unbalanced, and for the first time, balanced XLR outputs putting it into the professional range of studio effects.

New to the 501 and 555 was the chorus effect. They also had noise reduction systems which gave a much cleaner sound than earlier models.

References

External links 

 Inside the Roland RE-201 Space Echo (interactive Blend4Web infographic)

Sound recording technology
Effects units
Japanese inventions